Dalian Zhoushuizi International Airport  is the airport serving the city of Dalian in Liaoning Province, China. In 2018 the airport handled 18,758,171 passengers, making it the busiest airport in Northeast China and the 24th busiest nationwide. The airport is the hub for Dalian Airlines and a focus city for China Southern Airlines and Hainan Airlines. As Zhoushuizi Airport has reached its designed capacity, the new Dalian Jinzhouwan International Airport is being built on reclaimed land to replace it.

History

Zhoushuizi was originally an insect-infested marsh, called "Choushuizi" or "smelly waters" by nearby residents. During the late Qing dynasty, it became a racecourse for horse racing. After the marsh was drained, it was renamed Zhoushuizi (Zhou's waters) after a nearby village called Zhoujiatun ("Zhou family village").

After Japan won the Russo-Japanese War in 1905, the Liaodong Peninsula, including Dalian, came under Japanese occupation. In 1924, the Japanese began to convert Zhoushuizi Racecourse into an airport, which was opened in 1927. Immediately after the aviation law of 1927, the Japanese Ministry of Posts and Telecommunications began planning for scheduled air routes including Tokyo to Dalian (Zhoushuizi). As civil aviation developed later, a few flights per day by Manchukuo National Airways came to Zhoushuizi. After the start of the Second Sino-Japanese War in 1937, there was more military traffic by the Imperial Japanese Navy than civil traffic, mostly using Douglas DC-3. Zhoushuizi Airport at that time was about 800 meters long and 400 meters wide.

After the surrender of Japan in 1945, Zhoushuizi was under the control of the Soviet Air Forces for ten years, until it was transferred to the Chinese PLA Air Force in May 1955. In 1973, the military Zhoushuizi airfield was converted into a small civil airport, with a 2,040-meter-long runway and 37 employees, serving 1,961 passengers a year.

As air traffic skyrocketed starting in the 1980s and especially since the 1990s, the airport had its first major expansion in April 1984. It was then expanded four more times, in 1992–93, 1999, 2005, and 2011–12. It served more than 13 million passengers in 2012, ranking 15th in China. Because of the expansion of the city of Dalian, the airport is now surrounded by built-up urban area and has no more room to grow even though it is expected to reach its capacity in 2016. As a result, the authorities launched the new Dalian Jinzhouwan International Airport project, which was included in the 12th national five-year plan in 2011.

Facilities
In September 2011, a new 71,000 square-meter terminal building was completed as part of the 2.2 billion yuan third-phase expansion project of the airport. The airport has a 3,300-meter runway (class 4E),  of terminal buildings, 42 aircraft parking places, and 2,600 car parking places.

Airlines and destinations
As a focus city for China Southern Airlines, Dalian has many of China Southern's Japanese destinations. China's flag carrier, Air China, also makes a stop-over at Dalian on its flights from Beijing to Japan. Due to the tight connection and high demand between Dalian and Japan, Japan Airlines still operates daily direct flight from Narita Airport in Tokyo to Dalian. Two major South Korean airlines, Korean Air and Asiana Airlines operate daily flight to Dalian from Incheon Airport in Seoul. The majority of international flights are operated by China Southern Airlines, Air China, Japan Airlines, All Nippon Airways, Asiana Airlines, Korean Air and Uni Air.

Passenger

Cargo

Ground transportation
The airport is served by the Dalian Metro Line 2 and many bus lines to central Dalian. An airport bus line also serves the central district. A taxi hub station is located on the ground level.

Accidents and incidents
On May 7, 2002, China Northern flight 6136 was en route from Beijing to Dalian when a arsonist set the aircraft on fire causing the aircraft to lose control and crash in Bohai bay killing everyone onboard.

See also
List of airports in China
List of the busiest airports in China

References

External links
 Official site

Airports in Liaoning
1927 establishments in China
1973 establishments in China
Airports established in 1927
Airports established in 1973
Transport in Dalian
Buildings and structures in Dalian